Wolterdingen is a village near Donaueschingen in the southern Black Forest of the Baden-Württemberg federal state in Germany, the site of a post World War II British sector displaced person camp.

Villages in Baden-Württemberg